Fright Night Part 2 is a 1988 American horror film directed by Tommy Lee Wallace and starring William Ragsdale, Roddy McDowall, Traci Lind, and Julie Carmen. It is the sequel to the 1985 film Fright Night, with Ragsdale and McDowall reprising their roles. Composer Brad Fiedel also returned with another distinct synthesizer score. Following the plot of the first film, it focuses on Charley Brewster who, now a college student, encounters a group of vampires led by a beautiful woman who is seeking him out.

Released by New Century/Vista in North America and TriStar Pictures elsewhere in 1989, the film grossed almost $3 million domestically, and has since become a cult film like its predecessor. In 2003, it received a brief issuing on DVD by Artisan Entertainment in a full frame presentation, but the release quickly went out of print and has since become a rare collector's item.

A third film was planned with a target release year of 1990, but studio discussions over the popularity of the franchise led to the film being cancelled. In October 2020, Tom Holland, director of the original Fright Night, confirmed that he was writing a film called Fright Night: Resurrection that would ignore the 1988 sequel and be a direct sequel to his original film.

Plot

Three years after the first film, 20-year-old Charley Brewster, as a result of psychiatric therapy, now believes that Jerry Dandrige was nothing but a serial killer posing as a vampire. As a result, he comes to believe that vampires never existed.
 
College student Charley, along with his new girlfriend, Alex Young, go to visit Peter Vincent, who is again a burnt-out vampire killer on Fright Night, much to the chagrin of Charley. While visiting Peter's apartment Charley sees three large crates being offloaded from a truck. On the way out from Peter's apartment, Charley sees four strange people walk past him, into an elevator. Charley instantly becomes drawn to one of the four, the alluring Regine Dandridge. Charley drives Alex back to her dorm and begins to make out with her, only to see himself kissing Regine and pull away. An upset Alex storms off, not realizing that something is following her. Another girl leaves the dorm as Alex enters, and she is followed and killed by one of Regine's vampires, Belle. Alex, meanwhile, is unaware that Louie, another of Regine's group, is scaling up the wall outside her window, but he is startled and falls when Alex inadvertently slams her window shut on his hands. Bozworth, a bug-eating servant of Regine, makes fun of Louie before consuming some bugs.

Later that night, Charley dreams that Regine comes to visit him, only to turn into a vampire and bite him. The next day, Charley talks to his psychiatrist, Dr. Harrison, who assures him that what he dreamed was only natural. Alex finds Charley bowling, per doctor's orders, and Charley agrees to go to the symphony with her. On his way there, however, he sees his friend Richie Green with Regine and opts to follow him. Charley climbs up to a fire escape outside of Regine's apartment, only to be horrified when he sees Regine and Belle attack and drain Richie's blood. Charley runs off to find Peter, and the two of them arm themselves with crosses and crash Regine's party.

There, Charley finds Richie, but is shocked to find him alive and well, with no bite marks on his neck. Regine makes her entrance, doing an erotic dance with a mesmerized Charley. She introduces herself to Peter and Charley, and claims to be a performance artist in town for some shows. Satisfied that what he thought was Regine attacking Richie was nothing but an act, Charley leaves when he remembers his date with Alex. Peter elects to stay behind and while looking around, he notes that there are people in the corners of the room biting others on the neck. Noting the odd behavior, he draws his pocket mirror and finds that Regine and Belle, who are dancing in the middle of the dance floor, cast no reflections.

Storming out of the party, Peter runs into Regine waiting for him outside. As he runs down the stairwell Peter again comes face-to-face with Regine, who reveals herself as a vampire, the sister of Jerry Dandrige, and has come to take her revenge on both Charley and Peter. Peter runs back home and hides, resolving to tell Charley in the morning what has just transpired. Charley, meanwhile, after being turned away from the symphony, returns home and falls asleep, only to be visited by Regine, who bites him on the neck while he sleeps. Charley, content with the explanation that Regine is a performance artist, is once again in denial. He begins to discuss the situation with Alex when Peter arrives to try to warn the couple about Regine but neither believe him. Peter states that he has warned them and runs back to his home, packs his belongings and departs.

Meanwhile, Charley has started to show signs of being a vampire as he is becoming sensitive to garlic and sunlight. After failing to talk to his psychiatrist, he overhears a news report about Richie's body being discovered the previous night. Now believing that everything is real, Charley goes to see Peter, only to find that Peter has gone. Louie is once again stalking Alex. Louie reveals his true nature to Alex and Charley and stalks them in the school library, only to flee after Alex injures him by cramming wild roses, which are harmful to vampires, into his mouth. Alex and Charley are then arrested by campus officers.

Peter, meanwhile, is also arrested by the cops after he shows up on the set of Fright Night and attempting to kill its new host, Regine, on live TV. Everyone thinks he's lost his sanity as he says, "I have to kill the vampire"; and ends up in a state hospital. Alex is bailed out by Dr. Harrison and goes to post bail for Charley, only to find that he has already been bailed out by Regine. Alex and Dr. Harrison head to the state hospital when the doctor reveals that he is in fact a vampire. He tries to bite Alex only for her to turn the tables on him and run him through with a piece of wood. She then assumes his identity as a doctor and tries to have Peter released from the hospital. A distraction intentionally caused by one of the hospital's patients, Fritzy (who actually believes Peter's story about him being a vampire hunter) allows them to escape the place.

Alex and Peter head to Regine's lair in order to save Charley. They find a disoriented Charley, who is slowly turning into a vampire. They rescue him and manage to kill a now undead Richie, Belle, Bozworth and Louie before confronting Regine. She attempts to escape into her coffin, but finds that Charley and Alex have lined it with Communion wafers. Regine knocks Alex unconscious and attempts to turn Charley into a vampire, but Peter destroys her with sunlight.

Some time later, Charley and Alex discuss the previous day's events, with Alex joking that no one would ever believe them. They ponder if there are more vampires out there, but agree to continue on with their lives while being prepared, just in case. They embrace each other as a bat can be heard flying away.

Cast

Production
Original Fright Night director Tom Holland had been approached by producers to return, but Holland declined in favor of Child's Play.

Release

Box office
Unlike the first film, the sequel saw a very limited release in the US by distributor New Century/Vista and producer The Vista Organization. Shortly before filming began, the producers of the film sold foreign distribution rights to Tri-Star Pictures, the sister studio of Columbia Pictures, the studio that released the original film. The film was only released on 148 screens and brought in only $548,231 on its opening weekend. Its domestic gross was $2,983,784.

Critical reception

Fright Night Part 2 received negative reviews, currently holding a 36% on review aggregator website Rotten Tomatoes based on 11 reviews.

Accolades

Home media
International Video Entertainment (IVE, now known today as Lions Gate Home Entertainment) released the film on videocassette in 1989. In Australia, CBS/Fox Video released it to videocassette as a coffin-shaped VHS cover. The film was released on DVD by Artisan Entertainment on August 19, 2003, though the DVD soon went out of print. The transfer on the DVD was criticized for being of a low quality, apparently lifted from a VHS print of the film, and the DVD case also falsely claimed the film was presented in its "original" 1.33:1 pan-and-scan transfer, despite the fact that the film was shot on Panavision. A high definition transfer in the original aspect ratio was created for television airings. This transfer has been used to create widescreen, bootleg DVDs and Blu-rays of the film, due to the unavailability and low quality of the official DVD.

Future
Roddy McDowall relished playing Peter Vincent and was eager to bring original creator and director Tom Holland back to the franchise, so he had set up a meeting for himself and Holland with Carolco Pictures chairman José Menéndez. However, before that meeting could occur, Menéndez and his wife were murdered by their sons, Lyle and Erik. Not only did this stop another sequel, it also interfered with the release of Fright Night Part 2, which attained extremely limited theatrical distribution before being dumped on home video by Carolco's subsidiary, Live Entertainment.

In January 2017, Tom Holland announced that he was writing a Fright Night 3 novel and that in 2019 he would obtain the rights to the franchise and that a third film would be happening.  This would follow the continuity as the original 1985 Fright Night and its 1988 sequel without anything to do with the 2011 or 2013 films.

On October 28, 2020, original Fright Night director Tom Holland confirmed that he is writing a direct sequel to Fright Night titled Fright Night: Resurrection. This sequel would ignore the 1988 sequel and be a proper sequel to his original film. Holland said he wants to bring back the original characters as well saying "Of course, Charlie's back, and so is Evil Ed. I'm bringing back everybody I can. I'm calling it Resurrection because we’ve got to resurrect Billy Cole and Jerry Dandridge. And now I'll say no more." Holland went on to say "part of the issue with the attempts at sequels and remakes is that the movie itself was kind of a singular idea, and a follow-up needed to be more than just set in the same world -- it needed to draw from the same set of inspirations and follow a similar thematic thread."

Regine Dandridge actress Julie Carmen confirmed that she contributed to in depth interviews about working with director Tommy Lee Wallace and actors William Ragsdale Roddy McDowell and costume designer Joseph Porro in the upcoming 80's Horror Doc You're So Cool Brewster and in In Search of Darkness III plus author Adrian Roe's books Second Scream and his book about 80's horror First Scream to the Last.

See also
Vampire film

References

External links

 
 
 

1988 films
1988 horror films
1980s teen horror films
1980s comedy horror films
American independent films
American sequel films
American teen comedy films
American teen horror films
Films shot in Los Angeles
TriStar Pictures films
Fright Night (franchise)
Films directed by Tommy Lee Wallace
Films scored by Brad Fiedel
1988 comedy films
American vampire films
1980s English-language films
1980s American films